Wenxi County is a county in southern Shanxi province, China. It is under the administration of the prefecture level city of Yuncheng. As of 2020 it had a population of roughly 350,000.

The name Wenxi, which means "hearing the glad news", was used as the county name in 111 BC when Emperor Wu of Han, who on his royal progress at this place, heard Han's decisive victory in the Han–Nanyue War.

Climate

Archaeology 
In June 2022, archaeologists announced a discovery of a 2.8 cm long 5.200 years old stone carving chrysalis in a semi-crypt house at the Shangguo Site in Wenxi County in the city of Yuncheng. Archaeologists made suppositions that this house may have belonged to the Yangshao Culture period, based on the unearthed pottery pieces. According to archaeologist Tian Jianwen, discovery of stone carving chrysalises provided significant information for the study of the silkworm culture in China.

References

www.xzqh.org 

County-level divisions of Shanxi